Blue Peter (1946–1950) was an American Thoroughbred Champion racehorse.

Background
Bred and raced by Joseph M. Roebling, great-grandson of John A. Roebling, who built the Brooklyn Bridge, Blue Peter was out of the mare Carillon, a granddaughter of Teddy. He was sired by 1937 U.S. Triple Crown champion War Admiral, a son of Man o' War, who was ranked No. 1 in the Blood-Horse magazine list of the top 100 U.S. Thoroughbred champions of the 20th Century.

He was trained by former jockey Andy Schuttinger.

Racing career
Blue Peter was sent to the track in 1948 at age two. That year, he compiled a record of eight wins and two thirds from ten starts, with several of his wins coming in the premier events against the best horses in his age group such as the Belmont Futurity Stakes, and the Hopeful Stakes. The colt's performances earned him American Champion Two-Year-Old Colt honors.

Blue Peter did not race again and he died at age four of an illness at the Aiken Training Track on January 12, 1950.

Honors
In 1977, his racing career was honored with an induction in the Aiken Thoroughbred Racing Hall of Fame.

Pedigree

References

External links
 Blue Peter's pedigree and partial racing stats

1946 racehorse births
1950 racehorse deaths
Thoroughbred family 4-m
Racehorses bred in Kentucky
Racehorses trained in the United States
American Champion racehorses
Godolphin Arabian sire line